José António Caldas Oliveira (born 1 May 1959), known as Caldas, is a Portuguese retired footballer who played as a goalkeeper, and current manager.

Playing career
Born in Braga, Caldas played youth football with local S.C. Braga. He spent most of his career in the second division, during a 19-year professional career.

Caldas' input in the Primeira Liga consisted of ten games for F.C. Vizela in the 1984–85 season (team relegation), and 16 for F.C. Paços de Ferreira in the 1991–92 campaign. He was also part of top flight squads with Braga and C.F. União, but failed to appear in the league for either club.

Managerial career
Caldas began coaching whilst still an active player, with Leixões SC. He subsequently returned to Braga, being in charge of both the youth and the reserve sides and helping launch the career of Eduardo Carvalho, who went on to gain several caps for Portugal.

In 2006–07, Caldas managed G.D. Chaves before he returned to Braga, again being in charge of the under-19s, but after the sacking of Manuel Machado he was promoted to the main squad of SC Braga where in 2007 - 08 he qualified the team in to the first Intertoto Cup Qualification of the UEFA Cup.

Caldas moved to Angola in 2010, where he coached S.H. Benfica (Huambo) and
Interclube where he won the Angolan Cup and Super Cup. He made history with Interclub, it was the first time a team of Angola reached the semi final of the CAF Champions league. He is now currently coaching G.D Sagrada Esperança.] and G.D. Sagrada Esperança.

References

External links
 
 
 António Caldas at Footballdatabase

1959 births
Living people
Sportspeople from Braga
Portuguese footballers
Association football goalkeepers
Primeira Liga players
Liga Portugal 2 players
Segunda Divisão players
S.C. Braga players
G.D. Riopele players
F.C. Vizela players
Amarante F.C. players
Lusitânia F.C. players
F.C. Lixa players
F.C. Paços de Ferreira players
Leixões S.C. players
C.F. União players
Leça F.C. players
Portuguese football managers
Primeira Liga managers
Leixões S.C. managers
G.D. Chaves managers
S.C. Braga managers
G.D. Interclube managers
Portuguese expatriate football managers
Expatriate football managers in Angola
Portuguese expatriate sportspeople in Angola
Expatriate football managers in Armenia
Portuguese expatriate sportspeople in Armenia